List of works by or about Kit Reed, American writer.

Novels 
Mother Isn't Dead She's Only Sleeping (1961)
At War As Children (1964)
The Better Part (1967)
Armed Camps (1969)
Cry of the Daughter (1971)
Tiger Rag (1973)
Captain Grownup (1976)
The Ballad of T. Rantula (1979)
Magic Time (1980)
Fort Privilege (1985)
The Revenge of the Senior Citizens (1986)
Blood Fever (1986) [as by Shelley Hyde]
Catholic Girls (1987)
Gone (1992) [as by Kit Craig]
Twice Burned (1993) [as by Kit Craig]
Little Sisters of the Apocalypse (1994)
Strait (1995) [as by Kit Craig]
J. Eden (1996)
Closer (1997) [as by Kit Craig]
Some Safe Place (1998) [as by Kit Craig]
Short Fuse (1999) [as by Kit Craig]
@expectations (2000)
Thinner Than Thou (2004)
Bronze (2005)
The Baby Merchant (2006)
The Night Children (2008)
Enclave (2009)
Son of Destruction (2012)
Where (2015)
Mormama (2017)

Collections 
Mister Da V. and Other Stories (1967)
The Killer Mice (1976)
Other Stories and...The Attack of the Giant Baby (1981)
Thief of Lives (1992)
Weird Women, Wired Women (1998)
Seven for the Apocalypse (1999)
Dogs of Truth : New and Uncollected Stories (2005)
What Wolves Know (2011)
The Story Until Now: A Great Big Book of Stories (2013)

Anthologies 
Fat (1974)

Short stories 
See also her bibliographic entry in the Internet Speculative Fiction Database and also in the Laboratory of Fantastic.

Book reviews
Partial listing
 Doctors by Erich Segal
 Cordelia Underwood, Or the Marvelous Beginnings of the Moosepath League, by Van Reid
 Reservation Road, by John Burnham Schwartz
 The Better Man, by Anita Nair

Critical studies and reviews of Reed's work
The story until now

Notes 

Bibliographies by writer
Bibliographies of American writers
Science fiction bibliographies